Helmut Richard Niebuhr (September 3, 1894 – July 5, 1962) is considered one of the most important Christian theological ethicists in 20th-century America, best known for his 1951 book Christ and Culture and his posthumously published book The Responsible Self.  The younger brother of theologian Reinhold Niebuhr, Richard Niebuhr taught for several decades at the Yale Divinity School. Both brothers were, in their day, important figures in the neo-orthodox theological school within American Protestantism. His theology (together with that of his colleague at Yale, Hans Wilhelm Frei) has been one of the main sources of postliberal theology, sometimes called the "Yale school".  He influenced such figures as James Gustafson, Stanley Hauerwas, and Gordon Kaufman.

Life
Niebuhr was born on September 3, 1894, in Wright City, Missouri, the son of Gustav Niebuhr, a minister in the Evangelical Synod of North America. His family moved to Lincoln, Illinois, in 1902.  He graduated from Elmhurst College in 1912, and Eden Theological Seminary in 1915. He would later obtain a master's degree from Washington University in St. Louis in 1918, and his Doctor of Philosophy degree from Yale University in 1924.

He started his working career as a reporter in Lincoln in 1915 and 1916. He was ordained a minister in the Evangelical Synod in 1916, and served with that body in St. Louis, Missouri, through 1918.  (The synod merged in 1934 with the German Reformed Church in the United States; the subsequently formed Evangelical and Reformed Church united in 1957 with the Congregational Christian Churches to form the United Church of Christ.)  While living in St. Louis, he was a member and leader in Evangelical United Church of Christ in Webster Groves, Missouri, and taught at Eden Theological Seminary from 1919 to 1924 and from 1927 to 1931.  Between 1924 and 1927, he was the President of Elmhurst College. He taught at Yale from 1931 to 1962, specializing in theology and Christian ethics.

Niebuhr died on July 5, 1962, in Greenfield, Massachusetts.

Teachings
Niebuhr was concerned throughout his life with the absolute sovereignty of God and the issue of historical relativism. He considered Karl Barth and Ernst Troeltsch to be his main influences. He accepted from Barth and neo-orthodoxy the absolute transcendence of God. He believed that God is above history, that he makes commands upon human beings, and that all history is under the control of this God. Niebuhr borrowed often from Paul Tillich's notion of God. He was comfortable describing God as Being-itself, the One, or the Ground of Being. In this regard, Niebuhr held something of a middle ground between the dogmatic but dialectical theology of Karl Barth and the philosophically-oriented modified liberalism of Paul Tillich.

Niebuhr was also concerned with historical relativism. While God may be absolute and transcendent, human beings are not. Humans are a part of the flux and movement of the world. Because of this, how God is comprehended is never permanent. God is always understood differently by people at different times in history and in different social locations.  Niebuhr's theology shows great sensitivity to how expressions of faith differ from one religious community to another. His thought in some respects anticipated latter-day liberal Protestant concerns about pluralism and tolerance. However, in The Kingdom of God in America (1937), he also criticized the then-liberal social gospel, describing its message as, "A God without wrath brought men without sin into a kingdom without judgment through the ministrations of a Christ without a cross."

Niebuhr was, by training, a Christian ethicist. In this capacity, his biggest concern was how human beings relate to God, to each other, to their communities, and to the world. Niebuhr's theological ethics can be described, roughly, as relational. His greatest ethical treatise was The Responsible Self, published shortly after his death. It was intended to be the prologue of a much larger book on ethics.  His sudden death prevented his writing this work. In The Responsible Self, Niebuhr dealt with human beings as responding agents. Human beings are always "in response" to some influence, whether another human being, a community, the natural order or history, or, above all, God.

Christ and Culture
His most famous work is Christ and Culture. It is often referenced in discussions and writings on a Christian's response to the world's culture. In the book, Niebuhr gives a history of how Christianity has responded to culture. He outlines five prevalent viewpoints:

Christ against Culture. For the exclusive Christian, history is the story of a rising church or Christian culture and a dying pagan civilization.

Christ of Culture. For the cultural Christian, history is the story of the Spirit's encounter with nature.

Christ above Culture. For the synthesist, history is a period of preparation under law, reason, gospel, and church for an ultimate communion of the soul with God.

Christ and Culture in Paradox. For the dualist, history is the time of struggle between faith and unbelief, a period between the giving of the promise of life and its fulfillment. (Many have regarded the thought of Niebuhr's brother Reinhold as fitting into this category.)

Christ Transforming Culture. For the conversionist, history is the story of God's mighty deeds and humanity's response to them.  Conversionists live somewhat less "between the times" and somewhat more in the divine "now" than do the followers listed above.  Eternity, to the conversionist, focuses less on the action of God before time or life with God after time, and more on the presence of God in time.  Hence the conversionist is more concerned with the divine possibility of a present renewal than with conservation of what has been given in creation or preparing for what will be given in a final redemption.

Works
The Social Sources of Denominationalism (1929)
The Kingdom of God in America (1937)
The Meaning of Revelation (1941)
Christ and Culture (1951)
The Purpose of the Church and Its Ministry (1956)
Radical Monotheism and Western Culture (1960)
The Responsible Self (1963)
Faith on Earth: An Inquiry into the Structure of Human Faith (1989).

Translation
Paul Tillich, Die religiöse Lage der Gegenwart (Berlin: Ullstein 1926), as The Religious Situation (New York: Henry Holt & Co. 1932; reprint: Meridian Books, New York 1956).

References

Further reading
Bowden, Henry Warner. Dictionary of American Religious Biography. Westport, Connecticut. Greenwood Press, 1977. .

External links

H. Richard Niebuhr H. Richard Niebuhr Online Collections
H. Richard Niebuhr The Niebuhrs at Elmhurst College
 The papers of H. Richard Niebuhr are in Harvard Divinity School Library at Harvard Divinity School in Cambridge, Massachusetts.
Addresses, lectures, sermons, teaching materials, and writings
Correspondence, lectures, addresses, writings, teaching materials, diplomas, and scrapbooks

1894 births
1962 deaths
20th-century American theologians
American people of German descent
Christian ethicists
Eden Theological Seminary alumni
Elmhurst College alumni
People from Warren County, Missouri
Relational ethics
Washington University in St. Louis alumni
Yale University alumni
Yale University faculty
American Evangelical and Reformed Church members
United Church of Christ ministers
People from Lincoln, Illinois
Yale Sterling Professors
Writers from Missouri